Brian Duffield  is an American film director, screenwriter, and producer. He directed the 2020 dark comedy Spontaneous and films he has written include Love and Monsters (2020), Underwater (2020), and The Babysitter (2017). Duffield is noted as having multiple spec scripts being named to The Black List, an industry listing of well-regarded screenplays, including Jane Got a Gun (2015) and Your Bridesmaid is a Bitch.

Early life 
Duffield grew up in Harrisburg, Pennsylvania with his parents, Brian and Brenda Duffield, and two sisters. In 1995, at nine years old, he moved to Ireland when his parents decided to become missionaries. He described the surroundings as completely remote and lagging in popular culture. Duffield attended school where in one classroom, three grades were being taught by one teacher, which he described as very "Little House on the Prairie-esque". He moved back to the US when he graduated high school in 2004.

Duffield graduated from both Temple University and Messiah College in 2008. After graduation, he moved to Universal City, California for a summer internship through Temple University at the Oakwoods apartments prior to the 2007–08 Writers Guild of America strike and at the beginning of the Great Recession.

From there, Duffield worked various jobs before becoming a professional screenwriter. His first job in Los Angeles was at the now defunct Storyopolis, a children's book store/art gallery, in Studio City, where he worked with writer Blake Harris. He has also worked as an assistant and script reader within the film industry for several years. Prior to selling his first spec screenplay, Duffield was temping at the Lucky Brand Jeans factory in nearby Vernon, California.

Career 
Duffield first spec sale was for Your Bridesmaid is a Bitch to Skydance Media. The story is partially based on his personal experience with his friends' weddings and a slew of failed relationships. His friend from college had sent a copy to a contact at Circle of Confusion management company, who later offered to be Duffield's manager. Several days later, they got a meeting with Skydance, who bought the script. Eli Craig was last attached to direct and rewrite the film in May 2015. Black List Live!, a live monthly stage reading of scripts featured on the Black List, did a performance of Your Bridesmaid is a Bitch in 2014.

Duffield sold his script for Monster Problems to Paramount Pictures in 2012. Matthew Robinson was later brought on for rewrites and Michael Matthews directed the retitled film, Love and Monsters. The film was released in October 2020.

Duffield's first writing assignment was for the film adaptation of the second book in the Divergent trilogy, Insurgent (2015), in 2013.

The script for The Babysitter (2017) was sold to McG's company, Wonderland Sound and Vision, at auction. McG also directed the film, which later premiered on Netflix in October 2017.

In 2020, the thriller Underwater starring Kristen Stewart was released. The screenplay was by Duffield and revised by Adam Cozad. Duffield made his writer-director debut with the dark comedy Spontaneous later that year.

Personal life 
Duffield is married. His parents still reside in Ireland.

Filmography

References

External links 
 
 

1985 births
Living people
21st-century American screenwriters
Screenwriters from Pennsylvania
American male screenwriters
Film directors from Pennsylvania
Temple University alumni
Messiah University alumni
People from Harrisburg, Pennsylvania